Parexilisia is a genus of moths in the family Erebidae. The genus was erected by Hervé de Toulgoët in 1958.

Species
 Parexilisia bipunctoides Toulgoët, 1953
 Parexilisia diehli Toulgoët, 1958
 Parexilisia indecisa Toulgoët, 1956
 Parexilisia simulator Toulgoët, 1958
 Parexilisia submarginalis Toulgoët, 1958

References

Lithosiini